Hrib pri Kamniku is a small settlement in the Municipality of Kamnik in the Upper Carniola region of Slovenia.

Name
The name of the settlement was changed from Hrib to Hrib pri Kamniku in 1955.

References

External links 
Hrib pri Kamniku on Geopedia

Populated places in the Municipality of Kamnik